Bulla (Latin, 'bubble') may refer to:

Science and medicine
 Bulla (dermatology), a bulla 
 Bulla, a focal lung pneumatosis, an air pocket in the lung
 Auditory bulla, a hollow bony structure on the skull enclosing the ear
 Ethmoid bulla, part of the ethmoid bone of the skull
 Bulla (gastropod), a genus of sea snails

Places
 Bulla, Victoria,  Australia
 Bulla Bridge
 Bulla Island, in the Caspian Sea
 Bulla Regia, an archaeological site in northwestern Tunisia

Other uses
 Bulla (amulet), given to boys in Ancient Rome
 Bulla (seal), in archaeology, an inscribed clay or soft metal token used in ancient times for commercial or legal documentation
 Bulla cake, a Jamaican food
 Bulla Dairy Foods, an Australian dairy company
 Bulla (Dragon Ball), a fictional character 
 A fictional character of Ricky Grover

See also

 Bula (disambiguation)
 Bull (disambiguation)
 Bubble (disambiguation)
 Golden bull, or Bulla Aurea
 Papal bull (Latin bulla, plural bullae), a type of letter or charter issued by a pope